The first season of the Australian drama television series Love Child, began airing on 17 February 2014 on the Nine Network. The season concluded on 7 April 2014. The season consisted of 8 episodes and aired on Mondays at 8:40pm.

Production 
On 8 April 2013, the Nine Network announced a new drama project from Playmaker Media named Love Child, an eight-part drama series by the creators of House Husbands. Production for season one began in June 2013 and finished in September 2013.

Cast

Main 
 Jessica Marais as Joan Millar
 Jonathan LaPaglia as Dr Patrick McNaughton
 Mandy McElhinney as Matron Frances Bolton
 Ryan Johnson as Phillip Paige 
 Ryan Corr as Johnny Lowry
 Ella Scott Lynch as Shirley Ryan
 Harriet Dyer as Patricia Saunders
 Sophie Hensser as Viv Maguire
 Gracie Gilbert as Annie Carmichael
 Miranda Tapsell as Martha Tennant

Recurring 
 Maya Stange as Eva McNaughton
 Aileen Beale as Saleswoman Mark Foy's
 Lucy Wigmore as Carol

Episodes

References 

2014 Australian television seasons